Sheri Stewart Tepper (July 16, 1929 – October 22, 2016) was an American writer of science fiction, horror and mystery novels.  She is primarily known for her feminist science fiction, which explored themes of sociology, gender and equality, as well as theology and ecology. Often referred to as an eco-feminist of science fiction literature, Tepper personally preferred the label eco-humanist. Though the majority of her works operate in a world of fantastical imagery and metaphor, at the heart of her writing is real-world injustice and pain. She employed several pen names during her lifetime, including A. J. Orde, E. E. Horlak, and B. J. Oliphant.

Early life and education

She was born Shirley Stewart Douglas near Littleton, Colorado. As a child, she read science fiction and fantasy by A. Merritt and C.S. Lewis, as well as Frank Baum's 'Oz' books, William Hope Hodgson's The Night Land and Islandia by Austin Tappan Wright. She later commented, "These were the books I went back to again and again."

Career

Tepper recalled she "spent ten years...working all kinds of different jobs" as a single mother of two. This included time working as a clerical assistant for the international relief agency, CARE. From 1962 to 1986, she worked for Rocky Mountain Planned Parenthood, eventually as its executive director.

She wrote poetry and children's stories as Sheri S. Eberhart then took a break from writing. By the mid-1980s, she was publishing science fiction novels, including The Revenants (1984), and the books of the True Game series, including King's Blood Four (1983), Necromancer Nine (1983), and Wizard's Eleven (1984). Other related works followed, including her ecofeminist novels The Gate to Women's Country (1988) and Grass (1989), which was part of the Arbai Trilogy. Later novels in the 1990s and 2000s included Beauty (1991), which won a Locus Award; Shadow's End (1994), The Family Tree (1997), Six Moon Dance (1998), Singer from the Sea (1999), The Visitor (2002), The Companions (2003), and The Margarets (2007).

As of 1998, she operated a guest ranch near Santa Fe, New Mexico. That year saw her first and possibly only appearance at a science fiction convention, when she was Guest of Honor at the 25th WisCon, the feminist science fiction convention held annually in Madison, Wisconsin.

In November 2015, she received the World Fantasy Award for Life Achievement.

Personal life
She married at 20, and divorced in her late twenties. She married Gene Tepper in the late 1960s.

She died on October 22, 2016 at age 87.

Works

Novels

Series
The True Game (a trilogy of trilogies)
The Peter series was the first published. The Mavin series takes place earlier. The Jinian series takes place during and after the same time period as the Peter series, often giving a different perspective on the same events.
This series has a crossover with the Plague of Angels series.
The Books of the True Game: Peter
King's Blood Four (Ace Books, 1983) (first novel)
Necromancer Nine (Ace Books, 1983)
Wizard's Eleven (Ace Books, 1984)
The True Game (omnibus edition) (1985)
The Books of the True Game: Mavin Manyshaped
The Song of Mavin Manyshaped (Ace Books, 1985)
The Flight of Mavin Manyshaped (Ace Books, 1985)
The Search of Mavin Manyshaped (Ace Books, 1985)
The Chronicles of Mavin Manyshaped (omnibus edition) (1985)
The Books of the True Game: Jinian
Jinian Footseer (Tor Books, 1985)
Dervish Daughter (Tor Books, 1986)
Jinian Star-Eye (Tor Books, 1986)
The End of the Game (omnibus edition)
The Marianne Trilogy
Marianne, the Magus, and the Manticore (Ace Books, 1985)
Marianne, the Madame, and the Momentary Gods (Ace Books, 1988)
Marianne, the Matchbox, and the Malachite Mouse (Ace Books, 1989)
The Marianne Trilogy (omnibus edition)
Ettison Duo, featuring Badger Ettison
Blood Heritage (Tor Books, 1986)
The Bones (Tor Books, 1987)
The Awakeners:
Northshore (Tor Books, 1987)
Southshore (Tor Books, 1987)
The Awakeners (omnibus edition, 1989. A later omnibus edition erroneously claims to be first)
Plague of Angels:
A Plague of Angels (Bantam, 1993)
The Waters Rising (Eos, 2010) - Arthur C. Clarke Award nominee, 2010
Fish Tails (2014), a crossover into the True Game series
The Arbai Trilogy
Grass (Doubleday, 1989) – Hugo and Locus Awards nominee, 1990
Raising the Stones (Doubleday, 1990)
Sideshow (Doubleday, 1992) – John W. Campbell Award nominee, 1993

Non-series
The Revenants (Berkley Publishing, 1984)
After Long Silence (1987) (UK: The Enigma Score, 1989)
The Gate to Women's Country (1988)
Beauty (Doubleday, 1991; revised UK edition is author's preferred text) – Winner, Locus Award for Best Fantasy Novel, 1992
Shadow's End (1994)
Gibbon's Decline & Fall (1996) – Arthur C. Clarke Award nominee, 1997
The Family Tree (1997) – Arthur C. Clarke Award nominee, 1998
Six Moon Dance (1998)
Singer from the Sea (1999)
The Fresco (2000) – John W. Campbell Memorial Award nominee, 2001
The Visitor (2002) – John W. Campbell Memorial Award nominee, 2003
The Companions (2003) – John W. Campbell Memorial Award nominee, 2004
The Margarets (released June 1, 2007 by Eos) – John W. Campbell Memorial Award nominee, 2008; Arthur C. Clarke Award nominee, 2009

Short works
"The Gardener" (novella) in Night Visions 6. Released as The Bone Yard (1988) in mass market. Collaboration with F. Paul Wilson and Ray Garton. World Fantasy Award—Long Fiction finalist (1989)
"Someone Like You" in The Further Adventures of the Joker (ed. Martin Greenberg) (1990)
The "Crazy" Carol Stories
"The Gazebo" in The Magazine of Fantasy & Science Fiction, October 1990
"Raccoon Music" in The Magazine of Fantasy & Science Fiction, February 1991
"The Gourmet" in The Magazine of Fantasy & Science Fiction, October/November 1991

Poetry
"Extraterrestrial Trilogue on Terran Self-Destruction" in Galaxy, August 1961 (as Sheri S. Eberhart)
"Lullaby, 1990" in Galaxy, December 1963 (as Sheri S. Eberhart)
"Ballad of the Interstellar Merchants" in Galaxy, December 1964 (as Sheri S. Eberhart)

Essays/articles
Educational pamphlets for Rocky Mountain Planned Parenthood:

 The People Know (1968)
 The Perils of Puberty (1974)
 The Problem with Puberty (1976)
 This Is You (1977)
 So Your Happily Ever After Isn't (1977)
 The Great Orgasm Robbery (1977)
 So You Don't Want to Be a Sex Object (1978)

Pseudonymous works
as E. E. Horlak (horror):
Still Life (Bantam, 1987/1988)
as B. J. Oliphant (mystery):
Shirley McClintock Mysteries, featuring a Colorado rancher and former Washington, DC "advisor":
Dead in the Scrub (1990)
The Unexpected Corpse (1990)
Deservedly Dead (1992)
Death and the Delinquent (1993)
Death Served Up Cold (1994)
A Ceremonial Death (1996)
Here's to the Newly Dead (1997)
as A. J. Orde (mystery):
 The Jason Lynx Mysteries, featuring a Colorado antiques dealer and his significant other, a female cop:
A Little Neighborhood Murder: A Jason Lynx Novel (1989)
Death and the Dogwalker: A Jason Lynx Novel (1990)
Death for Old Time's Sake: A Jason Lynx Novel (1992)
Looking for the Aardvark (1993) (also published in paperback as Dead on Sunday, 1994)
A Long Time Dead (Fawcett, 1994)
A Death of Innocents: A Jason Lynx Novel (1996, 1997)

References

External links

 
 
 
 E. E. Horlak, B.J. Oliphant, and A. J. Orde at LC Authorities (one, five, and seven records)

1929 births
2016 deaths
20th-century American essayists
20th-century American novelists
20th-century American short story writers
20th-century American women writers
21st-century American essayists
21st-century American novelists
21st-century American short story writers
21st-century American women writers
American fantasy writers
American horror writers
American mystery writers
American science fiction writers
American women essayists
American women novelists
American women short story writers
Ecofeminists
Environmental fiction writers
Novelists from Colorado
People from Littleton, Colorado
Women horror writers
Women mystery writers
Women science fiction and fantasy writers
World Fantasy Award-winning writers
Writers from Santa Fe, New Mexico